On 25 January 2010, three suicide car bombs exploded in quick succession in central Baghdad, Iraq. At least 41 people were killed. On 27 January 2010 the Islamic State of Iraq claimed responsibility for the attack.

Attack 
The first explosion occurred around at 3:30 pm (1230 GMT). The second blast came just minutes later in the centre of the capital near the Green Zone, with the third close by soon after.

Perpetrators 
While the attack was not yet claimed, an Iraqi government advisor immediately blamed al-Qaeda.

See also
Terrorist incidents in Iraq in 2010

References 

2010 murders in Iraq
21st-century mass murder in Iraq
2010s in Baghdad
January 2010 crimes
January 2010 events in Iraq
Mass murder in 2010
Suicide car and truck bombings in Iraq
Suicide bombings in Baghdad
Terrorist incidents in Baghdad
Terrorist incidents in Iraq in 2010